Serhiy Yavorskyi (born 5 July 1989) is a Ukrainian professional footballer who plays as a defender for Vorskla Poltava.

Career
Yavorskyi was born in Donetsk, Ukrainian SSR. He is a product of the FC Shakhtar Donetsk sportive school. He was loaned to FC Illichivets Mariupol in Ukrainian Premier League from 4 June 2010.

On 11 January 2012, Yavorskyi was signed full contract with FC Illichivets Mariupol in Ukrainian Premier League.

Yavorskyi left FC Tobol in December 2016.

References

External links
 
 
 Profile at Allplayers.in.ua

1989 births
Living people
Footballers from Donetsk
Ukrainian footballers
Ukraine under-21 international footballers
FC Olimpik Donetsk players
FC Mariupol players
FC Obolon-Brovar Kyiv players
FC Vorskla Poltava players
Ukrainian Premier League players
Ukrainian First League players
Ukrainian Second League players
Kazakhstan Premier League players
Association football defenders
Expatriate footballers in Kazakhstan
Ukrainian expatriate footballers
FC Tobol players
Ukrainian expatriate sportspeople in Kazakhstan
Ukraine youth international footballers